The Clinton Furnace is located in the Newfoundland section of West Milford in Passaic County, New Jersey, United States. The furnace was built in 1826 and was added to the National Register of Historic Places on June 18, 1976.

See also
Clinton Road
Oxford Furnace
National Register of Historic Places listings in Passaic County, New Jersey

References

Buildings and structures in Passaic County, New Jersey
Industrial buildings and structures on the National Register of Historic Places in New Jersey
Industrial buildings completed in 1826
National Register of Historic Places in Passaic County, New Jersey
1826 establishments in New Jersey
New Jersey Register of Historic Places
West Milford, New Jersey